Andrea D'Agostino (born 3 July 1985) is an Italian professional football player currently playing for Renato Curi Angolana.

He represented Italy at the 2005 FIFA World Youth Championship.

External links
 

1985 births
Living people
Italian footballers
Italy youth international footballers
Calcio Foggia 1920 players
Potenza S.C. players
F.C. Pavia players
A.S. Sambenedettese players
Association football midfielders